Rhodocoma capensis, called the Cape restio, is a species of reed-like perennial grass in the family Restionaceae, native to the southwestern Cape Provinces of South Africa. Growing over 2m tall, with clumping, jointed stems, it has gained the Royal Horticultural Society's Award of Garden Merit as an ornamental, suitable for borders and architectural applications.

References

Restionaceae
Endemic flora of South Africa
Flora of the Cape Provinces
Grasses of South Africa
Plants described in 1855